Mezobromelia hospitalis, synonym Cipuropsis hospitalis, is a species of flowering plant in the family Bromeliaceae, native to Colombia. It was first described by Lyman Bradford Smith in 1948 as Tillandsia hospitalis.

References

hospitalis
Flora of Colombia
Plants described in 1948